Là dove non batte il sole, also known as The Stranger and the Gunfighter and El kárate, el Colt y el impostor, is a 1974 kung fu Spaghetti Western comedy film directed by Antonio Margheriti and starring Lo Lieh and Lee Van Cleef. The film is based upon an original screenplay by Barth Jules Sussman who received sole screenplay credit as can be seen in the film credits. The other writers names listed elsewhere in this article were attached after production ended to take advantage of Italian tax rebates. It was produced by the Shaw Brothers Studio in collaboration with an Italian company, and filmed on location in Hong Kong and Spain. For English-language release, the film was retitled The Stranger and the Gunfighter and Blood Money.

Synopsis
Martial arts expert Ho Chiang journeys to America's Wild West on a life-or-death mission: he must retrieve his late uncle Wang's missing fortune and return it to a powerful Warlord (the original owner of the fortune), or his family will be executed. Ho frees the thief who unintentionally killed his uncle after blowing Wang's safe, Dakota, as he is the only man who knows Wang's final resting place. Upon recovering the body, the pair discovers clues pointing to an apparent buried treasure. Notes on the dead man's body promise that the location of the treasure will be illuminated by a map, divided for security into four segments, each one tattooed as a message on the buttocks of all of Wang's four mistresses. Armed with photographs of the women, Ho and Dakota form an uneasy alliance and set out in search of the map tattoos and the promised riches, only to be closely followed by a bloodthirsty Preacher, who wants to divide the fortune between himself, a strong Aboriginal ringfighter and a gang of criminals.

Cast 
 Lee Van Cleef ... Dakota
 Lo Lieh ... Ho Chiang
 Patty Shepard ... Russian mistress & her twin-sister
 Femi Benussi ... Italian mistress
 Karen Yeh ... Chinese mistress
 Julián Ugarte ... Yancey Hobbitt
 Erika Blanc ... American mistress
 Tung-Kua Ai ... Uncle Wang (uncredited)
 Barta Barri ... Sheriff (uncredited)
 Chan Shen ... Warlord's Commanding Officer (uncredited)
 Chen Ping ... Wang's sister (uncredited)
 Ching Miao ... Mr. Wang (uncredited)
 Gene Collins ... Fight Promoter (uncredited)
 Paul Costello ... Wang's Lawyer (uncredited)
 Manuel de Blas ... Brothel Owner (uncredited)
 Anita Farra (uncredited)
 Lo Wai ... Warlord guard (uncredited)
 Ricardo Palacios ... Calico (uncredited)
 Goyo Peralta ... Indio (uncredited)
 George Rigaud ... Lord Barclay (uncredited)
 Wang Chiang ... Royal guard (uncredited)
 Yuen Cheung-yan ... Royal guard (uncredited)

Production
The Stranger and the Gunfighter was produced at a time when the Shaw Brothers were attempting to branch into more international co-productions, often genre-bending.  The same year also saw the Shaw Brothers Studio teaming with the UK's Hammer Studios to produce The Legend of the 7 Golden Vampires, a kung fu gothic horror film.

References

External links 
 
 Antonio Margheriti - Official Site
 Shaw Brothers History

1974 films
1970s action comedy films
1970s Western (genre) comedy films
Martial arts comedy films
Shaw Brothers Studio films
Columbia Pictures films
Spaghetti Western films
Films directed by Antonio Margheriti
Films scored by Carlo Savina
Treasure hunt films
Films shot in Almería
1974 comedy films
1970s Italian films